Lester Henry Fresholtz (December 21, 1931 – March 2021) was an American sound engineer. He won two Academy Awards for Best Sound and was nominated for ten more in the same category. He worked on more than 110 films between 1968 and 1996. He died in March 2021 at the age of 89.

Selected filmography
Fresholtz won two Academy Awards and was nominated for another ten:

Won
 All the President's Men (1976)
 Bird (1988)

Nominated
 Marooned (1969)
 Paper Moon (1973)
 Bite the Bullet (1975)
 The Electric Horseman (1979)
 Altered States (1980)
 Tootsie (1982)
 Ladyhawke (1985)
 Heartbreak Ridge (1986)
 Lethal Weapon (1987)
 Unforgiven (1992)

References

External links

1931 births
2021 deaths
American audio engineers
Best Sound BAFTA Award winners
Best Sound Mixing Academy Award winners